is a railway station in the city of  Ōbu, Aichi Prefecture, Japan, operated by Central Japan Railway Company (JR Tōkai).

Lines
Kyōwa Station is served by the Tōkaidō Main Line, and is located 349.5 kilometers from the starting point of the line at Tokyo Station.

Station layout
The station has one side platform and one island platform connected by an elevated station building.The station building has automated ticket machines, TOICA automated turnstiles and a staffed ticket office.

Platforms

Adjacent stations

|-
!colspan=5|Central Japan Railway Company

Station history
Kyōwa Station was opened on December 7, 1933, as a passenger station on the Japanese Government Railways (JGR) Tōkaidō Main Line. The station was closed on November 1, 1940, and reopened on July 11, 1945, but only for seasonal operations. The JGR became the Japan National Railway (JNR) after World War II. Full passenger operations did not resume until September 1, 1951.  With the privatization and dissolution of the JNR on April 1, 1987, the station came under the control of the  Central Japan Railway Company. Automatic turnstiles were installed in May 1992, and the TOICA system of magnetic fare cards was implemented in October 2007.

Station numbering was introduced to the section of the Tōkaidō Line operated JR Central in March 2018; Kyōwa Station was assigned station number CA61.

Passenger statistics
In fiscal 2018, the station was used by an average of 9666 passengers daily.

Surrounding area
 Ōbu Kita Junior High School
 Kyocho Elementary School

See also
 List of Railway Stations in Japan

References

Yoshikawa, Fumio. Tokaido-sen 130-nen no ayumi. Grand-Prix Publishing (2002) .

External links

official home page

Railway stations in Japan opened in 1933
Railway stations in Aichi Prefecture
Railway stations in Japan opened in 1934
Tōkaidō Main Line
Stations of Central Japan Railway Company
Ōbu, Aichi